Connor Iggulden (born ) is a British author who writes historical fiction, most notably the Emperor series and Conqueror series. He also co-authored The Dangerous Book for Boys along with his brother Hal Iggulden. In 2007, Iggulden became the first person to top the UK fiction and non-fiction charts at the same time.

Background
Born in 1971 to an English father (who was an RAF pilot during the Second World War) and Irish mother (whose grandfather was a seanchaí). He went to Sacred Heart Roman Catholic Primary in Ruislip, Middlesex, then attended St Martins School in Northwood, before moving on to Merchant Taylors' School. He then went to St Dominic's Sixth Form College, before he studied English at the University of London, and went on to teach the subject for seven years, becoming head of the English department at Haydon School, where one of his students was Fearne Cotton. He eventually left teaching to write his first novel, The Gates of Rome. He is married to Ella, who is from the Amalfi Coast in Southern Italy and whose family are renowned craft pasta and ravioli specialist producers in the region. They have four children and live in Hertfordshire, England, near Chorleywood Golf Club.

In August 2014, Iggulden was one of 200 public figures who were signatories to a letter to The Guardian opposing Scottish independence in the run-up to September's referendum on that issue.

Career

Historical fiction
Iggulden's debut book was The Gates of Rome, the first in a currently five-part series entitled Emperor. The series is based around the life of Julius Caesar, from childhood (The Gates of Rome) to his eventual betrayal and death (The Gods of War). The film option has been sold to Spitfire Productions (an Intermedia company).

The author has written a fifth book in the series, Emperor: The Blood of Gods, which deals with the rise of Augustus and events after the end of The Gods of War. This book was published on 26 September 2013.

After completing the fourth book in the Emperor series, Iggulden began research for his next series of books, the Conqueror series, based on the life of Mongol warlords Genghis, Ogedai and Kublai Khan. His first book, Wolves of the Plains, was available from 2 January 2007. Then followed his second book, Lord of the Bows, on 2 January 2008. Bones of the Hills, the third book in the series, was released on 1 September 2008. In September 2010 Empire of Silver was released, which revolves around the life of Genghis Khan's son, Ogedai. Whilst Iggulden had initially confirmed on his official website that he would be writing two more books after Empire of Silver on Kublai Khan, the author's note at the end of Conqueror states that it would be the last in the series. Iggulden explains his desire to leave the character when he still had much left to accomplish, rather than tracing him through to his eventual downfall, as he did with Julius Caesar and Genghis Khan.

Iggulden released a four-book series, the Wars of the Roses series, starting with Stormbird in 2013, Margaret of Anjou (called Trinity in the United Kingdom) in 2014, Bloodline in 2015, and Ravenspur in 2016.

In 2017, Iggulden published a historical fiction novel called Dunstan, chronicling the life of the 10th century monk and political adviser to the Saxon Kings of England, St. Dunstan.

In 2018, Penguin Books released a historical novel called The Falcon of Sparta, about the effort of Prince Cyrus to become King of Persia and the stranded 10,000 Greek mercenaries who walked out of Persia while pursued by the King's armies following the Battle of Cunaxa.

Children's books
Iggulden co-wrote a book with his brother Hal, The Dangerous Book for Boys. It covers around eighty topics, from building a soapbox racer and tying knots, to learning about famous battles and how to make potassium aluminium sulphate crystals. It was released in the UK in June 2006, reprinted a month later and was voted British Book of the Year at the Galaxy British Book Awards.

In September 2009 he wrote a children's book Tollins: Explosive Tales for Children through HarperCollins. Iggulden has since written three stories to accompany the story of the Tollins.

Other works
In March 2006, Iggulden released a novelette entitled Blackwater, part of the Quick Reads initiative of World Book Day 2006. Being a thriller, Blackwater was a change in genre for Iggulden who had mainly written historical fiction.

In 2012 Iggulden added a further quickreads book to the list Quantum of Tweed – The Man with a Nissan Micra – a comedy about an unwitting hitman.

Fantasy novels 
In 2017, Conn Iggulden released the first book in his first fiction fantasy series, Darien: Empire of Salt. This series is being published under the pen name C.F. Iggulden to avoid confusion with Iggulden's historical fiction novels. The second book in the series, Shiang, was released on 2018 followed by The Sword Saint in 2019.

Emperor series film adaptation
In 2010, there was media coverage toward a proposed epic film Emperor: Young Caesar to be about the early life of Julius Caesar covering the years from 92 BC to 71 BC and based on the first two novels of Iggulden's Emperor series, The Gates of Rome and The Death of Kings.  Exclusive Media Group hired Burr Steers to direct after they had an adaptation penned by William Broyles and Stephen Harrigan.

Bibliography

Emperor series
The Gates of Rome (2003)
The Death of Kings (2004)
The Field of Swords (2005)
The Gods of War (2006)
The Blood of Gods (2013)

Conqueror series
Wolf of the Plains (2007) (titled Genghis: Birth of an Empire 2010)
Lords of the Bow (2008) (titled Genghis: Lords of the Bow 2010)
Bones of the Hills (2008) (titled Genghis: Bones of the Hills 2010)
Empire of Silver (2010) (titled Genghis: Empire of Silver 2010)
Conqueror (2011)

Wars of the Roses series
Stormbird (2013)
Trinity (2014) (titled "Margaret of Anjou" in North America)
Bloodline (2015)
Ravenspur (2016)

Athenian series 
 The Gates of Athens (2020)
 Protector (2021)

The Golden Age series
 Lion (2022)

Empire of Salt series 
 Darien (2017) (Empire of Salt book #1) [as C.F. Iggulden]
 Shiang (2018) (Empire of Salt book #2) [as C.F. Iggulden]
 The Sword Saint (2019) (Empire of Salt book #3) [as C.F. Iggulden]

Dangerous books
The Dangerous Book for Boys (2007) (with Hal Iggulden)
The Pocket Dangerous Book for Boys: Things to Do (2007) (with Hal Iggulden)
The Dangerous Book for Boys Yearbook (2007) (with Hal Iggulden)
The Pocket Dangerous Book for Boys: Things to Know (2008) (with Hal Iggulden)
The Pocket Dangerous Book for Boys: Wonders of the World (2008) (with Hal Iggulden)
The Pocket Dangerous Book for Boys: Facts, Figures and Fun (2008) (with Hal Iggulden)
The Dangerous Book of Heroes (2009) (with David Iggulden)

Other
Blackwater (2006)
Tollins: Explosive Tales for Children (September 2009)
How to Blow Up Tollins (with Lizzy Duncan) (October 2010)
 Quantum of Tweed – The Man with the Nissan Micra (2012)
 Dunstan (2017), a.k.a. The Abbot's Tale (USA, 2018)
The Falcon of Sparta (2018) by Conn Iggulden

References

External links 
 
 Conn Iggulden page on publisher HarperCollins' website

1971 births
Alumni of the University of London
Living people
English historical novelists
21st-century English novelists
People educated at Merchant Taylors' School, Northwood
Writers of historical fiction set in antiquity
Writers of historical fiction set in the Middle Ages
English male novelists
British psychological fiction writers
21st-century English male writers